Fernando Julián Esteso Allué (16 February 1945) is a Spanish actor and singer.

Biography
In 1949 at the age of four he made his debut as a clown with his father, in 1964 he moved to Madrid where he did stage plays and in 1973 he made his debut on films.

Career
He made a comic duo with Andrés Pajares and they appeared in nine comedy films between 1979 and 1983 such as Los energéticos, Los bingueros, Yo hice a Roque III, Los chulos, Los liantes, Padre no hay más que dos, Todos al suelo, Agítese antes de usarla and La lola nos lleva al huerto, some of them starring Antonio Ozores, Adriana Vega, Mirta Miller, Paloma Hurtado, Ángel de Andrés.

He also worked as a singer, including the songs "La Ramona", "El Zurriagazo", "El Bellotero pop" and "Los niños con las niñas". In 2011 "La Ramona" was sung by King Africa and Esteso.

In 2006 he was going to appear in a new film along Antonio Pajares and named El código Aparinci, but it was cancelled.

Awards
In 2016 he won the Simón de Honor at Premios Simón.

Filmography

References

External links
 

1945 births
Spanish male television actors
Spanish male film actors
Spanish male comedians
Living people
People from Zaragoza